Renārs Rode (born 6 April 1989 in Riga) is a retired Latvian professional footballer who played as a centre-back. He has also been capped by the Latvia national football team.

Club career

Skonto Riga
As a youth player Renārs Rode played for the Skonto Riga academy. In 2008, he joined the Latvian Higher League club JFK Olimps, and played 15 matches, scoring his first league goal in a 7–0 victory over Daugava Rīga on 8 July 2009. In 2010 Rode moved to Skonto Rīga. During his first season at the club, he scored 3 goals in 16 league matches and under the manager Aleksandrs Starkovs became the champion of the Latvian Higher League. In 2011, he helped the club win the Baltic League and in 2012 won his first Latvian Cup with Skonto. In January 2012 it was announced that Rode would go on trial with the Scottish Premiership club Heart of Midlothian alongside his teammate Armandrs Pētersons, but the potential move fell through. After the 2013 Latvian Higher League season Rode was included in the sportacentrs.com and Sporta Avīze teams of the tournament, having appeared in 25 league matches and scored 3 goals, with Skonto suffering only one loss throughout the season. All in all, during his four seasons with the club Rode played 90 league matches, scoring 10 goals, and appeared in two UEFA Champions League and eight UEFA Europa League matches.

FK Teplice
On 10 December 2013 it was announced that Rode had signed a two-year contract with the Czech Gambrinus Liga club FK Teplice after a successful trial period. Rode left the club in March 2014 having been given a notice of contract termination after the arrival of the newly appointed manager. Following the release Rode went on trial with the Norwegian Tippeligaen side Sarpsborg 08, but did not stay with the club.

FK Ventspils
On 17 July 2014 Rode returned to the Latvian Higher League, signing a contract with the title holders FK Ventspils. He helped the club retain the title for the second year in a row.

Return to Skonto
Prior to the 2015 Latvian Higher League season Rode moved to his former club Skonto Riga. He participated in the UEFA Europa League qualifying stages helping his club beat the Irish club St Patrick's Athletic. Rode scored a goal in the next qualifying round which saw Skonto losing hopelessly against the Hungarian side Debreceni VSC.

SK Sigma Olomouc
Following the 2015 season Rode went on trial with the Premier Soccer League club Mpumalanga Black Aces. However, it was later announced that he would not be joining the team at that particular time and that the coach considered a potential move for Rode during the next transfer period. In February 2016 Rode joined the Czech First League club SK Sigma Olomouc signing a half-year contract with an option to extend it for another year.

FK Jelgava
On 16 December 2018, Rode signed with FK Jelgava for one year.

Later career
In the beginning of 2020, Rode joined JDFS Alberts. In June 2020, Rode announced his retirement from professional football and a few days later, JDFS Alberts confirmed that Rode had been appointed assistant coach of the club.

International career 
Rode was a member of Latvia national under-21 football team. He received his first full international call-up under that time manager Aleksandrs Starkovs on 22 January 2010 for a friendly match against South Korea. His next call-up came just 3 years later, when he was included in the national squad for a friendly match against Estonia on 14 August 2013 by the newly appointed Marians Pahars. Rode made his full international debut for Latvia on 6 September 2013 in a 2–1 2014 World Cup qualifying victory over Lithuania. He scored his first international goal on 15 October 2013 in a WC qualifying match against Slovakia, securing Latvia a point with a late goal in a 2–2 draw.

International goals

Scores and results list Latvia's goal tally first.

Honours
Skonto FC
 Latvian Higher League champion (1): 2010
 Baltic League champion (1): 2011
 Latvian Cup winner (1): 2012
FK Ventspils
 Latvian Higher League champion (1): 2014

References 

http://www.sport24.co.za/Soccer/PSL/sim-rode-set-to-depart-cape-town-city-20161230

External links 
 
 
 
 
 

1989 births
Living people
Footballers from Riga
Latvian footballers
Association football defenders
Latvia international footballers
JFK Olimps players
Skonto FC players
FK Teplice players
Latvian expatriate footballers
Expatriate footballers in the Czech Republic
Latvian expatriate sportspeople in the Czech Republic
Czech First League players
FK Ventspils players
SK Sigma Olomouc players
FK RFS players
FK Jelgava players